is a Japanese professional drifting driver. He currently competes in the D1 Grand Prix series for Team Toyo Tires Drift, and is the 2017 series champion.

He is based in Fukaya.

Career 
Fujino started to compete in D1GP on its early day of competition but due to his results not being good enough he stopped competing in 2003

After the D1 Street Legal was launched in 2006 he start to compete in it instead, he claim his first D1SL win in opening round of the 2013 season. He's also compete in The Drift Musle and claimed the championship 3 times from 2014 to 2016

2015 mark his return to D1GP driving an SR20 powered 180SX he managed to finishes second on his return to the series after long time. he along with Masato Kawabata later launch their own body kit for 180SX named Kick Blue which is sell by both his shop Wisteria and Kawabata's newly open shop True Man Racing

Starting from 2016 he would get support from Toyo Tires and compete in full-time basis. his best finish was second in round 6 at Ebisu and he end the season third in standings.

2017 was his best season winning his first round at the opening round of the season he claimed his second win at round 4 and heading to the final round of the season he lead the championship from Masashi Yokoi, Akira Hirajima, Masato Kawabata and Daigo Saito in a 5-way fight for the championship, he succeeded to keep his championship lead after winning his battle in best 8 and seal his first D1GP title and also the solo run champions.
 
In 2018 he started the season with a win in the second round but he was unable to defend his title and finish the season sixth in standings. The following year he is promoted to Toyo Tires main team after Trust's withdrawal from the competititon and is one of the championship contenders for D1GP but loses out on the final round.

In 2021 he change his car to Toyota 86 previously driven by Thai driver Daychapond Toyingcharoen and got second place on the first round with the car and lead the championship for the first time since 2018, despite strong start to his season he struggled for the rest of the season and ended up in eleventh in the standings.

At 2022 Tokyo Auto Salon he announced that he will debut the newly released Toyota GR86 for that year D1GP he also built the same car for his teammate Kawabata. On the first round he is able to win the solo run and claim third in battle while his teammate wins the round, his best result is second on the penultimate round and he ended the season fifth in standings, an improvement from the previous season.

Complete Drifting Results

D1 Grand Prix

References

Sources
D1 Grand Prix
Fujino's D1 Profile

Japanese racing drivers
Drifting drivers
1974 births
Living people
D1 Grand Prix drivers